Norok Lokei is a 1969 Khmer film starring Chea Yuthon, Nop Yada and Sak Si Sboung.

Cast 
Chea Yuthon
Nop Yada
Sak Si Sboung

Soundtrack 
Nork Lokei by  Ros Serey Sothear
Lea Huy Songsa Khnhom by Sinn Sisamouth and Ros Serey Sothea

References 

1969 films
Khmer-language films
Cambodian drama films